James Greene may refer to:
James Durrell Greene (1828–1902), American inventor and Civil War Brevet Brig. General
James Edward Greene (1914–1977), Liberian politician
James Greene (American actor) (1926–2018), actor on Broadway and in Philadelphia Experiment II
James Greene (Canadian politician) (1928–2014), leader of the Progressive Conservative Party of Newfoundland
James Greene (Northern Irish actor) (1931–2021), television actor
James Greene (swimmer) (1876–1962), American Olympic swimmer
James K. Greene, member of the Alabama House of Representatives
James Tyler Greene (born 1983), American baseball player
Jim Greene (born 1950), Irish hurling player
Jimmy Greene (born 1975), American musician

See also
James Green (disambiguation)